Normative economics (as opposed to positive economics) is the part of economics that deals with normative statements. It focuses on the idea of fairness and what the outcome of the economy or goals of public policy ought to be. 

Economists commonly prefer to distinguish normative economics ("what ought to be" in economic matters) from positive economics ("what is"). Many normative (value) judgments, however, are held conditionally, to be given up if facts or knowledge of facts changes, so that a change of values may be purely scientific. On the other hand, welfare economist Amartya Sen distinguishes basic (normative) judgements, which do not depend on such knowledge, from nonbasic judgments, which do. He said, "no judgments are demonstrably basic" while some value judgments may be shown to be nonbasic. This leaves open the possibility of fruitful scientific discussion of value judgments.

Positive and normative economics are often synthesized in the style of practical idealism.  In this discipline, sometimes called the "art of economics," positive economics is utilized as a practical tool for achieving normative objectives, which often involve policy changes or states of affairs.

An example of a normative economic statement is as follows:

The price of milk should be $6 a gallon to give dairy farmers a higher living standard and to save the family farm.

This is a normative statement, because it reflects value judgments. This specific statement makes the judgment that farmers deserve a higher living standard and that family farms ought to be saved.

Normative economics predicates itself upon maximizing both an agents social and political utility, recognized as "aggregating interests".  

Subfields of normative economics include social choice theory, cooperative game theory, and mechanism design.

Some earlier technical problems posed in welfare economics and the theory of justice have been sufficiently addressed as to leave room for consideration of proposals in applied fields such as resource allocation, public policy, social indicators, and inequality and poverty measurement.

See also 

 Distribution (economics)
 Economic ideology
 Is-ought problem
 Justice (economics)
 Normative science
 Positive economics
 Social welfare function
 Social choice theory
 Welfare economics
 Economic progressivism

Notes

References
 Andrew Caplin and Andrew Schotte, ed. (2008). The Foundations of Positive and Normative Economics: A Handbook,  Oxford. Description and preview.
 Marc Fleurbaey (2004). "Normative Economics and Theories of Distributive Justice," The Elgar Companion to Economics and Philosophy, J.B. Davis and J. Runde, ed., pp. 132-58.
 _ (2008). "Ethics and economics," The New Palgrave Dictionary of Economics. Abstract.
 Milton Friedman (1953). "The Methodology of Positive Economics," Essays in Positive Economics
 John C. Harsanyi (1987), “Value judgments," The New Palgrave: A Dictionary of Economics, v. 4, pp. 792–93
 Daniel M. Hausman and  Michael S. McPherson (1996). Economic Analysis and Moral Philosophy, Cambridge: Cambridge University Press.
 Phillipe Mongin (2002). "Is There Progress in Normative Economics?" in Stephan Boehm et al., eds., Is There Progress in Economics?, pp. 145-170.
Amartya K. Sen (1970), Collective Choice and Social Welfare. "5.3 Basic and Nonbasic Judgments" & "5.4 Facts and Values," pp. 59–64.
 Stanley Wong (1987). “Positive economics," The New Palgrave: A Dictionary of Economics, v. 3, pp. 920–21.
 Silvestri P. (ed.), L. Einaudi, On Abstract and Historical Hypotheses and on Value judgments in Economic Sciences, Critical edition with an Introduction and Afterword by Paolo Silvestri, Routledge, London - New York, 2017. DOI: https://doi.org/10.4324/9781315457932.

Welfare economics
Economic methodology